The Fear, The Fear, The Fear is Defiance, Ohio's third full-length album. The album was originally scheduled to be released on No Idea Records during the Fest in Gainesville, Florida, but was delayed until December 4. As with all of the band's recordings, the album is available free on the band's website. It was recorded at Russian Recordings in Nashville, Indiana.

As the name of the album (which is derived from a line in track five, "Eureka!") and many of the track titles indicate, the major lyrical theme of The Fear, The Fear, The Fear is fear. Other major themes include anxiety, worry, isolation, monotony, and acceptance.

This album marks a shift in sound for Defiance, Ohio, with Ryan Woods taking up an electric bass instead of his usual double bass.

Track listing

Personnel
Music
 Geoff Hing – guitar, vocals
 Ryan Woods – bass, vocals
 Will Staler – drums, guitar, vocals
 BZ – violin, piano
 Sherri Miller – cello, banjo, vocals
 Theo Hilton – drums, guitar, piano, vocals

Production
 Mike Bridavsky - engineer, mastering, mixing

Albums free for download by copyright owner
2007 albums
Defiance, Ohio (band) albums